The 2002 Limerick Senior Hurling Championship was the 108th staging of the Limerick Senior Hurling Championship since its establishment by the Limerick County Board.

Adare were the defending champions.

On 13 October 2002, Adare won the championship after a 0-14 to 0-12 defeat of Ahane in the final. It was their second championship title overall and their second title in succession.

Results

Final

References

Limerick Senior Hurling Championship
Limerick Senior Hurling Championship